Ritual Productions is a London-based independent record label launched in 2010.

Biography
On the summer solstice of 2010, Ritual put out their first release, Ramesses' Take the Curse. The album artwork features images by Jake and Dinos Chapman of their work Fucking Hell, from the 2008 "If Hitler Had Been a Hippy How Happy Would We Be" exhibition at London's White Cube Gallery. Additionally, Ramesses have released the following albums on Ritual Productions: Chrome Pineal, Possessed By The Rise Of Magik (with the LP featuring remixes from Justin Broadrick) and re-issues of We Will Lead You to Glorious Times,  The Tomb, and Misanthropic Alchemy.

Drone rock band Bong have too released numerous albums with Ritual Productions: We Are, We Were and We Will Have Been, Beyond Ancient Space, Mana-Yood Shushai, Stoner Rock, Thought and Existence and a re-issue of the band’s rare debut S/T, which came with a previously unreleased bonus track.

During 2013, Ritual released Superunnatural by new psychedelic rock group 11PARANOIAS, followed by Spectralbeastiaries in 2014 and Stealing Fire From Heaven in 2015. The band released their latest full-length, Reliquary For A Dreamed Of World in October 2016. The LP and CD formats for Reliquary For A Dreamed Of World came with a ‘Multi-Dimensional Paranoid Vision Key’ – based on the RGB colour model, a set of three coloured filters reveals different layers to the album artwork. 2019 saw the band release a new album, 'Asterismal', with artwork courtesy of contemporary British artist Toby Ziegler.

2015 saw heavy rock improv duo GHOLD release ‘Of Ruin’  – their debut on Ritual Productions. A second full-length for Ritual Productions, PYR, was released in 2016 and included an expanded line-up with the addition of multi-instrumentalist Oliver Martin.

2016 further saw three new bands, and their subsequent releases, added to the Ritual Productions roster. The Poisoned Glass from Seattle/Atlanta, consisting of Edgy59 and G. Stuart Dahlquist, released their debut album 10 SWORDS; Horse Latitudes from Helsinki released Primal Gnosis – their first on the Ritual Productions label - and NYC's Thralldom released their first music in over a decade, titled Time Will Bend Into Horror, the latter being only available on digital formats.

New band, Ancient Lights, signed to Ritual Productions in summer 2017. The band is composed of Adam Richardson (11PARANOIAS, Ramesses), Ben Carr (INTRCPTR, 5ive) and Tim Bertilsson (Switchblade). The band met in the early 2000s whilst playing shows together, eventually recording their debut album in North London during 2017.

In 2018, Ritual Productions announced the signing of Drug Cult, a four-piece occultist doom collective hailing from Mullumbimby, Australia. The band's debut rite was released in June 2018.

2019 saw the label re-release Brazilian band Basalt's debut album, 'O Coração Negro da Terra' on digital formats. The album has been exclusively remastered by labelmate Adam Richardson (11PARANOIAS, Ancient Lights, Ramesses).

Ritual Productions further released the album by Italian psychedelic black/doom metal trio,'Salbrox' in May 2019.

In collaboration with Diagonal Records, Ritual Productions released electronic noise artist Viviankrist's 2019 LP 'Cross Modulation'.

2020 saw Ritual Productions release Basalt's new album, 'Silêncio Como Respiração', their first full-length for the label. The year further included the release of Viviankrist's 'Cross Modulation - Bootleg Remixes' and a cassette tape boxset comprising four Viviankrist albums; 'Live in Studio 2018', 'Pop Incentive', 'Heavy Sleep' and 'Alabaster White'.

To date, 5 Ritual Productions artists have appeared at the Roadburn Festival in Tilburg, Netherlands.

Artists 

 11PARANOIAS
 Ancient Lights
 Basalt
 Bong
 Drug Cult
 Ghold
 Horse Latitudes
 Nibiru
Ramesses
 The Poisoned Glass
 Thralldom
 Viviankrist

Discography

Complete 12", CD & digital releases
RITE001CD: Ramesses - 'Take the Curse' CD
RITE002DL: Ramesses - 'Take the Curse' Digital Download
RITE003DL: Ramesses - 'We Will Lead You to Glorious Times' Digital Download
RITE004DL: Ramesses - 'The Tomb' Digital Download
RITE005DL: Ramesses - 'Misanthropic Alchemy' Digital Download
RITE006CD: Bong - 'Beyond Ancient Space' CD 
RITE007DL: Bong - 'Beyond Ancient Space' Digital Download
RITE008LP: Ramesses - 'Chrome Pineal' LP 
RITE009DL: Ramesses - 'Chrome Pineal' Digital Download
RITE010CD: Ramesses - 'Possessed by The Rise of Magik' CD
RITE011DL: Ramesses - 'Possessed by the Rise of Magik' Digital Download
RITE012LP: Ramesses - 'Possessed By The Rise of Magik' double LP 
RITE013LP: Ramesses - 'Take the Curse' double LP 
RITE014LP: Ramesses - 'Misanthropic Alchemy' double 12" LP + bonus material
RITE015CD Ramesses - 'Misanthropic Alchemy' double CD + bonus material
RITE016CD: Bong - 'Mana Yood Sushai' CD 
RITE017DL: Bong - 'Mana Yood Susha' Digital Download
RITE018CD: Bong - 'S/T' CD
RITE019DL: Bong - 'S/T' Digital Download
RITE020LP: Bong - 'Mana-Yood-Sushai' LP - second pressing on coloured vinyl
RITE021LP: 11PARANOIAS - 'Superunnatural' 12" LP 
RITE022CD:11PARANOIAS - 'Superunnatural' Digital Download
RITE023CD: 11PARANOIAS - 'Superunnatural' CD + bonus material - with deluxe full colour double sided PVC sleeve
RITE024LP: Bong - 'Stoner Rock' double LP 
RITE025CD: Bong - 'Stoner Rock' CD
RITE026DL: Bong - 'Stoner Rock' Digital Download
RITE027LP: Bong - 'Beyond Ancient Space' double LP - uncut, remixed, remastered specially for vinyl
RITE028LP: 11PARANOIAS - 'Spectralbeastiaries' 12" LP
RITE029DL: 11PARANOIAS - 'Spectralbeastiaries' Digital Download
RITE030CD - 11PARANOIAS 'Stealing Fire From Heaven' CD
RITE031LP - 11PARANOIAS 'Stealing Fire From Heaven' LP
RITE032DD - 11PARANOIAS 'Stealing Fire From Heaven' Digital Download
RITE033CD - Ghold 'Of Ruin' CD
RITE034LP - Ghold 'Of Ruin' LP
RITE035DD - Ghold 'Of Ruin' Digital Download
RITE036CD - Bong 'We are, we were and we will have been' CD
RITE037LP - Bong 'We are, we were and we will have been' LP
RITE038DD - Bong 'We are, we were and we will have been' Digital Download
RITE039LP - 11PARANOIAS 'Reliquary For A Dreamed Of World' LP - with MPV Key
RITE040CD - 11PARANOIAS 'Reliquary For A Dreamed Of World' CD - with MPV Key, bonus material and additional artwork
RITE041DD - 11PARANOIAS 'Reliquary For A Dreamed Of World' Digital Download
RITE042LP - Ghold 'PYR' LP 
RITE043CD - Ghold 'PYR' CD - with bonus track
RITE044DD - Ghold 'PYR' Digital Download
RITE045LP - The Poisoned Glass '10 Swords' LP
RITE046CD - The Poisoned Glass  '10 Swords' CD - with bonus track
RITE047DD - The Poisoned Glass  '10 Swords' Digital Download
RITE048LP - Horse Latitudes 'Primal Gnosis' Double LP
RITE049CD - Horse Latitudes 'Primal Gnosis' CD
RITE050DD - Horse Latitudes 'Primals Gnosis' Digital Download
RITE051DD - Thralldom - 'Time Will Bend Into Horror' Digital Download
RITE052LP - Bong ‘Thought and Existence’ LP
RITE053CD - Bong ‘Thought and Existence’ CD
RITE053CDLE - Bong ‘Thought and Existence’ Limited Edition CD
RITE054DD -  Bong ‘Thought and Existence’ Digital Download
RITE055LP - Ancient Lights ‘Ancient Lights’ Double LP
RITE056CD - Ancient Lights ‘Ancient Lights’ CD
RITE056CDLE - Ancient Lights ‘Ancient Lights’ Limited Edition CD
RITE057DD - Ancient Lights ‘Ancient Lights’ Digital Download
RITE058LP - Drug Cult ‘Drug Cult’ LP
RITE059CD - Drug Cult ‘Drug Cult’ CD
RITE059CDLE - Drug Cult ‘Drug Cult’ Limited Edition CD
RITE060DD - Drug Cult ‘Drug Cult’ Digital Download
RITE061LP - 11PARANOIAS ‘Asterismal’ LP
RITE062CD - 11PARANOIAS ‘ Asterismal’ CD
RITE062CDLE - 11PARANOIAS ‘ Asterismal’ Limited Edition CD
RITE063DD - 11PARANOIAS ‘ Asterismal’ Digital Download
RITE064LP - Nibiru ’Salbrox’ LP
RITE065CD - Nibiru ‘Salbrox’ CD 
RITE066DD - Nibiru ‘Salbrox’ DD
RITE067LP - Basalt ‘Silêncio Como Respiração’ LP
RITE068CD - Basalt ‘Silêncio Como Respiração’ CD
RITE069DD - Basalt ‘Silêncio Como Respiração’ Digital Download
RITE70DD - Basalt ‘O Coração Negro da Terra’ Digital Download
RITE071LP - Viviankrist ‘Cross Modulation - Bootleg Remixes’ LP
RITE071LPLE - Viviankrist ‘Cross Modulation - Bootleg Remixes’ Limited Edition LP
RITE072CD - Viviankrist ‘Cross Modulation - Bootleg Remixes’ CD
RITE072CDLE - Viviankrist ‘Cross Modulation - Bootleg Remixes’ Limited Edition CD
RITE073DD - Viviankrist ‘Cross Modulation - Bootleg Remixes’ Digital Download
RITE074CS - Viviankrist ‘Live in Studio 2018’ Cassette Tape
RITE075DD - Viviankrist ‘Live in Studio 2018’ Digital Download
RITE076CS - Viviankrist ‘Pop Incentive’ Cassette Tape
RITE077DD - Viviankrist ‘Pop Incentive’ Digital Download
RITE078CS - Viviankrist ‘Heavy Sleep’ Cassette Tape
RITE079DD - Viviankrist ‘Heavy Sleep’ Digital Download
RITE080CS - Viviankrist ‘Alabaster White’ Cassette Tape
RITE081DD - Viviankrist ‘Alabaster White’ Digital Download
RITE082CSB - Viviankrist Cassette Boxset

See also
 Doom metal
 Drone metal 
 List of record labels
 List of independent UK record labels

References

Record labels established in 2010
Record labels based in London
Doom metal record labels
Heavy metal record labels
Psychedelic music
Experimental music record labels